"Checkin' It Out" was the first single from British singer Lil' Chris' debut self-titled album. The single peaked at number three on the UK Singles Chart. It topped the UK Official Download Chart. The song featured in a television commercial for ASDA's George clothing range.

Track listing
 "Checkin' It Out" - 3:03
 "Me & My Life" [Acoustic Version] - 2:26

2006 songs
Lil' Chris songs
2006 debut singles
Songs with lyrics by Gary Osborne
Songs written by Ray Hedges
Songs written by Lil' Chris
Songs written by Nigel Butler